List in alphabetical order of the deputies of the 12th French National Assembly (2002–2007).

A
 Mr. Jean-Pierre Abelin, UDF, Vienne
 Mr. Jean-Claude Abrioux, UMP, Seine-Saint-Denis
 Mr. Bernard Accoyer, UMP, Haute-Savoie
 Ms. Patricia Adam, socialist, Finistère
 Mr. Manuel Aeschlimann, UMP, Hauts-de-Seine
 Mr. Damien Alary, socialist, Gard
 Mr. Pierre Albertini, associated with UDF, Seine-Maritime
 Mr. Alfred Almont, UMP, Martinique
 Mr. Jean-Paul Anciaux, UMP, Saône-et-Loire
 Mr. René André, UMP, Manche
 Ms. Sylvie Andrieux-Bacquet, socialist, Bouches-du-Rhône
 Mr. Gilles Artigues, UDF, Loire
 Mr. François Asensi, communist, Seine-Saint-Denis
 Mr. Philippe Auberger, UMP, Yonne
 Mr. François d'Aubert, UMP, Mayenne
 Mr. Jean-Marie Aubron, socialist, Moselle
 Mr. Jean Auclair, UMP, Creuse
 Mr. Bertho Audifax, UMP, Réunion
 Ms. Martine Aurillac, UMP, Paris
 Mr. Jean-Marc Ayrault, socialist, Loire-Atlantique

B
 Mr. Jean-Paul Bacquet, socialist, Puy-de-Dôme
 Mr. Pierre-Christophe Baguet, UDF, Hauts-de-Seine
 Mr. Patrick Balkany, independent, Hauts-de-Seine
 Mr. Édouard Balladur, UMP, Paris
 Mr. Jean-Pierre Balligand, socialist, Aisne
 Mr. Gérard Bapt, socialist, Haute-Garonne
 Mr. Jean Bardet, UMP, Val-d'Oise
 Ms. Brigitte Barèges, UMP, Tarn-et-Garonne
 Mr. François Baroin, UMP, Aube
 Mr. Jacques Barrot, UMP, Haute-Loire
 Mr. Claude Bartolone, socialist, Seine-Saint-Denis
 Mr. Jacques Bascou, socialist, Aude
 Ms. Sylvia Bassot, UMP, Orne
 Mr. Christian Bataille, socialist, Nord
 Mr. Jean-Claude Bateux, socialist, Seine-Maritime
 Mr. François Bayrou, UDF, Pyrénées-Atlantiques
 Mr. Jean-Claude Beauchaud, socialist, Charente
 Mr. Patrick Beaudouin, UMP, Val-de-Marne
 Mr. Joël Beaugendre, UMP, Guadeloupe
 Mr. Jean-Claude Beaulieu, UMP, Charente-Maritime
 Ms. Huguette Bello, independent, Réunion
 Mr. Jacques-Alain Bénisti, UMP, Val-de-Marne
 Mr. Jean-Louis Bernard, UMP, Loiret
 Mr. Marc Bernier, UMP, Mayenne
 Mr. André Berthol, UMP, Moselle
 Mr. Jean-Michel Bertrand, UMP, Ain
 Mr. Xavier Bertrand, UMP, Aisne
 Mr. Jean-Yves Besselat, UMP, Seine-Maritime
 Mr. Éric Besson, socialist, Drôme
 Mr. Jean Besson, UMP, Rhône
 Mr. Gabriel Biancheri, UMP, Drôme
 Mr. Jean-Louis Bianco, socialist, Alpes-de-Haute-Provence
 Mr. Gilbert Biessy, communist, Isère
 Mr. Jérôme Bignon, UMP, Somme
 Ms. Martine Billard, independent, Paris
 Mr. Jean-Marie Binetruy, UMP, Doubs
 Mr. Claude Birraux, UMP, Haute-Savoie
 Mr. Christian Blanc, associated with UDF, Yvelines
 Mr. Étienne Blanc, UMP, Ain
 Mr. Jean-Pierre Blazy, socialist, Val-d'Oise
 Mr. Émile Blessig, UMP, Bas-Rhin
 Mr. Serge Blisko, socialist, Paris
 Mr. Patrick Bloche, socialist, Paris
 Mr. Roland Blum, UMP, Bouches-du-Rhône
 Mr. Jacques Bobe, UMP, Charente
 Mr. Alain Bocquet, communist, Nord
 Mr. Jean-Claude Bois, socialist, Pas-de-Calais
 Mr. Yves Boisseau, UMP, Calvados
 Mr. Daniel Boisserie, socialist, Haute-Vienne
 Mr. Marcel Bonnot, UMP, Doubs
 Mr. Maxime Bono, socialist, Charente-Maritime
 Mr. Augustin Bonrepaux, socialist, Ariège
 Mr. Bernard Bosson, UDF, Haute-Savoie
 Mr. Jean-Michel Boucheron, socialist, Ille-et-Vilaine
 Mr. René Bouin, UMP, Maine-et-Loire
 Mr. Roger Boullonnois, UMP, Seine-et-Marne
 Mr. Gilles Bourdouleix, UMP, Maine-et-Loire
 Mr. Bruno Bourg-Broc, UMP, Marne
 Mr. Pierre Bourguignon, socialist, Seine-Maritime
 Ms. Chantal Bourragué, UMP, Gironde
 Ms. Danielle Bousquet, socialist, Côtes-d'Armor
 Ms. Christine Boutin, UMP, Yvelines
 Mr. Loïc Bouvard, UMP, Morbihan
 Mr. Michel Bouvard, UMP, Savoie
 Mr. Patrick Braouezec, communist, Seine-Saint-Denis
 Mr. Ghislain Bray, UMP, Seine-et-Marne
 Mr. Philippe Briand, UMP, Indre-et-Loire
 Mr. Jacques Briat, UMP, Tarn-et-Garonne
 Ms. Maryvonne Briot, UMP, Haute-Saône
 Mr. Bernard Brochand, UMP, Alpes-Maritimes
 Mr. François Brottes, socialist, Isère
 Ms. Chantal Brunel, UMP, Seine-et-Marne
 Mr. Jacques Brunhes, communist, Hauts-de-Seine
 Ms. Marie-George Buffet, communist, Seine-Saint-Denis
 Mr. Michel Buillard, UMP, French Polynesia
 Mr. Yves Bur, UMP, Bas-Rhin

C
 Mr. Christian Cabal, UMP, Loire
 Mr. Marcel Cabiddu, socialist, Pas-de-Calais
 Mr. Dominique Caillaud, UMP, Vendée
 Mr. François Calvet, UMP, Pyrénées-Orientales
 Mr. Jean-Christophe Cambadélis, socialist, Paris
 Mr. Bernard Carayon, UMP, Tarn
 Mr. Thierry Carcenac, socialist, Tarn
 Mr. Pierre Cardo, UMP, Yvelines
 Mr. Christophe Caresche, socialist, Paris
 Mr. Antoine Carré, UMP, Loiret
 Mr. Gilles Carrez, UMP, Val-de-Marne
 Ms. Martine Carrillon-Couvreur, socialist, Nièvre
 Mr. Laurent Cathala, socialist, Val-de-Marne
 Mr. Richard Cazenave, UMP, Isère
 Ms. Joëlle Ceccaldi-Raynaud, UMP, Hauts-de-Seine
 Mr. Yves Censi, UMP, Aveyron
 Mr. Jean-Yves Chamard, UMP, Vienne
 Mr. Jean-Paul Chanteguet, socialist, Indre
 Mr. Gérard Charasse, independent, Allier
 Mr. Hervé de Charette, UMP, Maine-et-Loire
 Mr. Jean-Paul Charié, UMP, Loiret
 Mr. Jean Charroppin, UMP, Jura
 Mr. Jérôme Chartier, UMP, Val-d'Oise
 Mr. Michel Charzat, socialist, Paris
 Mr. André Chassaigne, communist, Puy-de-Dôme
 Mr. Roland Chassain, UMP, Bouches-du-Rhône
 Mr. Luc-Marie Chatel, UMP, Haute-Marne
 Mr. Jean-Marc Chavanne, UMP, Haute-Savoie
 Mr. Gérard Cherpion, UMP, Vosges
 Mr. Jean-François Chossy, UMP, Loire
 Mr. Jean-Louis Christ, UMP, Haut-Rhin
 Mr. Dino Cinieri, UMP, Loire
 Mr. Alain Claeys, socialist, Vienne
 Mr. Pascal Clément, UMP, Loire
 Ms. Marie-Françoise Clergeau, socialist, Loire-Atlantique
 Mr. Philippe Cochet, UMP, Rhône
 Mr. Yves Cochet, independent, Paris
 Mr. Gilles Cocquempot, socialist, Pas-de-Calais
 Mr. Pierre Cohen, socialist, Haute-Garonne
 Mr. Georges Colombier, UMP, Isère
 Ms. Geneviève Colot, UMP, Essonne
 Ms. Anne-Marie Comparini, UDF, Rhône
 Mr. François Cornut-Gentille, UMP, Haute-Marne
 Mr. Louis Cosyns, UMP, Cher
 Mr. René Couanau, UMP, Ille-et-Vilaine
 Mr. Charles de Courson, UDF, Marne
 Mr. Édouard Courtial, UMP, Oise
 Mr. Alain Cousin, UMP, Manche
 Mr. Jean-Yves Cousin, UMP, Calvados
 Mr. Yves Coussain, UMP, Cantal
 Mr. Jean-Michel Couve, UMP, Var
 Mr. Charles Cova, UMP, Seine-et-Marne
 Mr. Paul-Henri Cugnenc, UMP, Hérault
 Mr. Henri Cuq, UMP, Yvelines

D
 Ms. Claude Darciaux, socialist, Côte-d'Or
 Mr. Olivier Dassault, UMP, Oise
 Mr. Michel Dasseux, socialist, Dordogne
 Mr. Marc-Philippe Daubresse, UMP, Nord
 Ms. Martine David, socialist, Rhône
 Mr. Jean-Louis Debré, UMP, Eure
 Mr. Jean-Claude Decagny, UMP, Nord
 Mr. Christian Decocq, UMP, Nord
 Mr. Jean-Pierre Decool, associated with UMP, Nord
 Mr. Bernard Deflesselles, UMP, Bouches-du-Rhône
 Mr. Jean-Pierre Defontaine, associated with socialist, Pas-de-Calais
 Mr. Lucien Degauchy, UMP, Oise
 Mr. Marcel Dehoux, socialist, Nord
 Mr. Francis Delattre, UMP, Val-d'Oise
 Mr. Michel Delebarre, socialist, Nord
 Mr. Richard Dell'Agnola, UMP, Val-de-Marne
 Mr. Patrick Delnatte, UMP, Nord
 Mr. Jean Delobel, socialist, Nord
 Mr. Jean-Marie Demange, UMP, Moselle
 Mr. Stéphane Demilly, UDF, Somme
 Mr. Yves Deniaud, UMP, Orne
 Mr. Bernard Depierre, UMP, Côte-d'Or
 Mr. Léonce Deprez, UMP, Pas-de-Calais
 Mr. Bernard Derosier, socialist, Nord
 Ms. Marie-Hélène des Esgaulx, UMP, Gironde
 Mr. Jacques Desallangre, communist, Aisne
 Mr. Jean-Jacques Descamps, UMP, Indre-et-Loire
 Mr. Michel Destot, socialist, Isère
 Mr. Éric Diard, UMP, Bouches-du-Rhône
 Mr. Jean Diébold, UMP, Haute-Garonne
 Mr. Michel Diefenbacher, UMP, Lot-et-Garonne
 Mr. Jean Dionis du Séjour, UDF, Lot-et-Garonne
 Mr. Marc Dolez, socialist, Nord
 Mr. Jacques Domergue, UMP, Hérault
 Mr. Renaud Donnedieu de Vabres, UMP, Indre-et-Loire
 Mr. Jean-Pierre Door, UMP, Loiret
 Mr. Dominique Dord, UMP, Savoie
 Mr. François Dosé, socialist, Meuse
 Mr. René Dosière, socialist, Aisne
 Mr. Philippe Douste-Blazy, UMP, Haute-Garonne
 Mr. Julien Dray, socialist, Essonne
 Mr. Tony Dreyfus, socialist, Paris
 Mr. Guy Drut, UMP, Seine-et-Marne
 Mr. Jean-Michel Dubernard, UMP, Rhône
 Mr. Philippe Dubourg, UMP, Gironde
 Mr. Gérard Dubrac, UMP, Gers
 Mr. Pierre Ducout, socialist, Gironde
 Mr. Jean-Pierre Dufau, socialist, Landes
 Mr. Jean-Louis Dumont, socialist, Meuse
 Mr. Jean-Pierre Dupont, UMP, Corrèze
 Mr. Nicolas Dupont-Aignan, UMP, Essonne
 Mr. Jean-Paul Dupré, socialist, Aude
 Mr. Yves Durand, socialist, Nord
 Mr. Frédéric Dutoit, communist, Bouches-du-Rhône

E
 Mr. Henri Emmanuelli, socialist, Landes
 Mr. Christian Estrosi, UMP, Alpes-Maritimes
 Mr. Claude Evin, socialist, Loire-Atlantique

F
 Mr. Laurent Fabius, socialist, Seine-Maritime
 Mr. Albert Facon, socialist, Pas-de-Calais
 Mr. Pierre-Louis Fagniez, UMP, Val-de-Marne
 Mr. Francis Falala, UMP, Marne
 Mr. Yannick Favennec, UMP, Mayenne
 Mr. Georges Fenech, UMP, Rhône
 Mr. Jean-Michel Ferrand, UMP, Vaucluse
 Mr. Alain Ferry, associated with UMP, Bas-Rhin
 Mr. Daniel Fidelin, UMP, Seine-Maritime
 Mr. André Flajolet, UMP, Pas-de-Calais
 Mr. Jacques Floch, socialist, Loire-Atlantique
 Mr. Jean-Claude Flory, UMP, Ardèche
 Mr. Philippe Folliot, associated with UDF, Tarn
 Mr. Pierre Forgues, socialist, Hautes-Pyrénées
 Mr. Nicolas Forissier, UMP, Indre
 Mr. Jean-Michel Fourgous, UMP, Yvelines
 Mr. Michel Françaix, socialist, Oise
 Ms. Arlette Franco, UMP, Pyrénées-Orientales
 Ms. Jacqueline Fraysse, communist, Hauts-de-Seine
 Mr. Pierre Frogier, UMP, New Caledonia
 Mr. Yves Fromion, UMP, Cher

G
 Mr. Claude Gaillard, UMP, Meurthe-et-Moselle
 Ms. Cécile Gallez, associated with UMP, Nord
 Mr. René Galy-Dejean, UMP, Paris
 Mr. Gilbert Gantier, UDF, Paris
 Mr. Daniel Gard, UMP, Aisne
 Mr. Jean-Paul Garraud, UMP, Gironde
 Mr. Daniel Garrigue, UMP, Dordogne
 Mr. Claude Gatignol, UMP, Manche
 Mr. Jean Gaubert, socialist, Côtes-d'Armor
 Mr. Jean de Gaulle, UMP, Paris
 Mr. Jean-Jacques Gaultier, UMP, Vosges
 Ms. Nathalie Gautier, socialist, Rhône
 Ms. Catherine Génisson, socialist, Pas-de-Calais
 Mr. Guy Geoffroy, UMP, Seine-et-Marne
 Mr. André Gerin, communist, Rhône
 Mr. Alain Gest, UMP, Somme
 Mr. Jean-Marie Geveaux, UMP, Sarthe
 Mr. Paul Giacobbi, associated with socialist, Haute-Corse
 Mr. Franck Gilard, UMP, Eure
 Mr. Bruno Gilles, UMP, Bouches-du-Rhône
 Mr. Georges Ginesta, UMP, Var
 Mr. Jean-Pierre Giran, UMP, Var
 Mr. Claude Girard, UMP, Doubs
 Mr. Joël Giraud, associated with socialist, Hautes-Alpes
 Mr. Maurice Giro, UMP, Vaucluse
 Mr. Louis Giscard d'Estaing, UMP, Puy-de-Dôme
 Mr. Jean Glavany, socialist, Hautes-Pyrénées
 Mr. Claude Goasguen, UMP, Paris
 Mr. Jacques Godfrain, UMP, Aveyron
 Mr. Pierre Goldberg, communist, Allier
 Mr. François-Michel Gonnot, UMP, Oise
 Mr. Gaëtan Gorce, socialist, Nièvre
 Mr. Jean-Pierre Gorges, UMP, Eure-et-Loir
 Mr. François Goulard, UMP, Morbihan
 Mr. Alain Gouriou, socialist, Côtes-d'Armor
 Mr. Jean-Pierre Grand, UMP, Hérault
 Ms. Claude Greff, UMP, Indre-et-Loire
 Mr. Maxime Gremetz, communist, Somme
 Mr. Jean Grenet, UMP, Pyrénées-Atlantiques
 Mr. Gérard Grignon, associated with UMP, Saint-Pierre-et-Miquelon
 Mr. François Grosdidier, UMP, Moselle
 Ms. Arlette Grosskost, UMP, Haut-Rhin
 Mr. Serge Grouard, UMP, Loiret
 Mr. Louis Guédon, UMP, Vendée
 Mr. Jean-Claude Guibal, UMP, Alpes-Maritimes
 Mr. Lucien Guichon, UMP, Ain
 Ms. Élisabeth Guigou, socialist, Seine-Saint-Denis
 Mr. François Guillaume, UMP, Meurthe-et-Moselle
 Mr. Jean-Jacques Guillet, UMP, Hauts-de-Seine
 Ms. Paulette Guinchard-Kunstler, socialist, Doubs

H
 Mr. David Habib, socialist, Pyrénées-Atlantiques
 Mr. Georges Hage, communist, Nord
 Mr. Gérard Hamel, UMP, Eure-et-Loir
 Mr. Emmanuel Hamelin, UMP, Rhône
 Mr. Joël Hart, UMP, Somme
 Mr. Michel Heinrich, UMP, Vosges
 Mr. Pierre Hellier, UMP, Sarthe
 Mr. Laurent Hénart, UMP, Meurthe-et-Moselle
 Mr. Michel Herbillon, UMP, Val-de-Marne
 Mr. Pierre Hériaud, UMP, Loire-Atlantique
 Mr. Patrick Herr, UMP, Seine-Maritime
 Mr. Antoine Herth, associated with UMP, Bas-Rhin
 Mr. Francis Hillmeyer, UDF, Haut-Rhin
 Ms. Danièle Hoffman-Rispal, socialist, Paris
 Mr. François Hollande, socialist, Corrèze
 Mr. Philippe Houillon, UMP, Val-d'Oise
 Mr. Jean-Yves Hugon, UMP, Indre
 Mr. Michel Hunault, UMP, Loire-Atlantique
 Mr. Sébastien Huyghe, UMP, Nord

I
 Mr. Jean-Louis Idiart, socialist, Haute-Garonne
 Ms. Françoise Imbert, socialist, Haute-Garonne

J
 Ms. Muguette Jacquaint, communist, Seine-Saint-Denis
 Mr. Denis Jacquat, UMP, Moselle
 Mr. Édouard Jacque, UMP, Meurthe-et-Moselle
 Mr. Éric Jalton, independent, Guadeloupe
 Ms. Janine Jambu, communist, Hauts-de-Seine
 Mr. Serge Janquin, socialist, Pas-de-Calais
 Mr. Olivier Jardé, UDF, Somme
 Mr. Christian Jeanjean, UMP, Hérault
 Mr. Yves Jego, UMP, Seine-et-Marne
 Ms. Maryse Joissains-Masini, UMP, Bouches-du-Rhône
 Mr. Marc Joulaud, UMP, Sarthe
 Mr. Alain Joyandet, UMP, Haute-Saône
 Mr. Dominique Juillot, UMP, Saône-et-Loire
 Mr. Didier Julia, UMP, Seine-et-Marne
 Mr. Armand Jung, socialist, Bas-Rhin
 Mr. Alain Juppé, UMP, Gironde

K
 Mr. Mansour Kamardine, UMP, Mayotte
 Mr. Aimé Kergueris, UMP, Morbihan
 Mr. Christian Kert, UMP, Bouches-du-Rhône
 Ms. Nathalie Kosciusko-Morizet, UMP, Essonne
 Mr. Jacques Kossowski, UMP, Hauts-de-Seine
 Mr. Jean-Pierre Kucheida, socialist, Pas-de-Calais

L
 Mr. Patrick Labaune, UMP, Drôme
 Mr. Yvan Lachaud, UDF, Gard
 Ms. Conchita Lacuey, socialist, Gironde
 Mr. Marc Laffineur, UMP, Maine-et-Loire
 Mr. Jacques Lafleur, UMP, New Caledonia
 Mr. Jean-Christophe Lagarde, UDF, Seine-Saint-Denis
 Mr. Jérôme Lambert, socialist, Charente
 Ms. Marguerite Lamour, UMP, Finistère
 Mr. François Lamy, socialist, Essonne
 Mr. Robert Lamy, UMP, Rhône
 Mr. Édouard Landrain, UMP, Loire-Atlantique
 Mr. Jack Lang, socialist, Pas-de-Calais
 Mr. Pierre Lang, UMP, Moselle
 Mr. Pierre Lasbordes, UMP, Essonne
 Mr. Jean Lassalle, UDF, Pyrénées-Atlantiques
 Mr. Jean Launay, socialist, Lot
 Mr. Thierry Lazaro, UMP, Nord
 Mr. Jean-Yves Le Bouillonnec, socialist, Val-de-Marne
 Ms. Marylise Lebranchu, socialist, Finistère
 Ms. Brigitte Le Brethon, UMP, Calvados
 Mr. Gilbert Le Bris, socialist, Finistère
 Mr. Robert Lecou, UMP, Hérault
 Mr. Jean-Yves Le Déaut, socialist, Meurthe-et-Moselle
 Mr. Jean-Yves Le Drian, socialist, Morbihan
 Mr. Michel Lefait, socialist, Pas-de-Calais
 Mr. Jean-Claude Lefort, communist, Val-de-Marne
 Mr. Jean-Marc Lefranc, UMP, Calvados
 Mr. Marc Le Fur, UMP, Côtes-d'Armor
 Mr. Jean Le Garrec, socialist, Nord
 Mr. Jacques Le Guen, UMP, Finistère
 Mr. Jean-Marie Le Guen, socialist, Paris
 Mr. Michel Lejeune, UMP, Seine-Maritime
 Mr. Pierre Lellouche, UMP, Paris
 Mr. Patrick Lemasle, socialist, Haute-Garonne
 Mr. Dominique Le Mèner, UMP, Sarthe
 Mr. Jean Lemière, UMP, Manche
 Mr. Jean-Claude Lemoine, UMP, Manche
 Mr. Jacques Le Nay, UMP, Morbihan
 Mr. Guy Lengagne, socialist, Pas-de-Calais
 Mr. Jean-Claude Lenoir, UMP, Orne
 Mr. Gérard Léonard, UMP, Meurthe-et-Moselle
 Mr. Jean-Louis Léonard, UMP, Charente-Maritime
 Mr. Jean Leonetti, UMP, Alpes-Maritimes
 Mr. Arnaud Lepercq, UMP, Vienne
 Ms. Annick Lepetit, independent, Paris
 Mr. Pierre Lequiller, UMP, Yvelines
 Mr. Jean-Pierre Le Ridant, UMP, Loire-Atlantique
 Mr. Bruno Le Roux, socialist, Seine-Saint-Denis
 Mr. Jean-Claude Leroy, socialist, Pas-de-Calais
 Mr. Maurice Leroy, UDF, Loir-et-Cher
 Mr. Claude Leteurtre, UDF, Calvados
 Mr. Céleste Lett, UMP, Moselle
 Mr. Édouard Leveau, UMP, Seine-Maritime
 Ms. Geneviève Levy, UMP, Var
 Mr. François Liberti, communist, Hérault
 Mr. Michel Liebgott, socialist, Moselle
 Ms. Martine Lignières-Cassou, socialist, Pyrénées-Atlantiques
 Mr. François Loncle, socialist, Eure
 Mr. Gérard Lorgeoux, UMP, Morbihan
 Ms. Gabrielle Louis-Carabin, UMP, Guadeloupe
 Mr. Lionnel Luca, UMP, Alpes-Maritimes
 Mr. Victorin Lurel, socialist, Guadeloupe

M
 Mr. Daniel Mach, UMP, Pyrénées-Orientales
 Mr. Alain Madelin, UMP, Ille-et-Vilaine
 Mr. Bernard Madrelle, socialist, Gironde
 Mr. Richard Mallié, UMP, Bouches-du-Rhône
 Mr. Noël Mamère, independent, Gironde
 Mr. Jean-François Mancel, UMP, Oise
 Mr. Louis-Joseph Manscour, socialist, Martinique
 Mr. Thierry Mariani, UMP, Vaucluse
 Mr. Alfred Marie-Jeanne, independent, Martinique
 Mr. Hervé Mariton, UMP, Drôme
 Ms. Muriel Marland-Militello, UMP, Alpes-Maritimes
 Mr. Alain Marleix, UMP, Cantal
 Mr. Franck Marlin, associated with UMP, Essonne
 Mr. Alain Marsaud, UMP, Haute-Vienne
 Mr. Jean Marsaudon, UMP, Essonne
 Mr. Philippe Martin, socialist, Gers
 Mr. Philippe Armand Martin, UMP, Marne
 Ms. Henriette Martinez, UMP, Hautes-Alpes
 Mr. Patrice Martin-Lalande, UMP, Loir-et-Cher
 Mr. Alain Marty, UMP, Moselle
 Mr. Jacques Masdeu-Arus, UMP, Yvelines
 Mr. Christophe Masse, socialist, Bouches-du-Rhône
 Mr. Jean-Claude Mathis, UMP, Aube
 Mr. Didier Mathus, socialist, Saône-et-Loire
 Mr. Pierre Méhaignerie, UMP, Ille-et-Vilaine
 Mr. Christian Ménard, UMP, Finistère
 Mr. Alain Merly, UMP, Lot-et-Garonne
 Mr. Denis Merville, UMP, Seine-Maritime
 Mr. Damien Meslot, UMP, Territoire de Belfort
 Mr. Kléber Mesquida, socialist, Hérault
 Mr. Gilbert Meyer, UMP, Haut-Rhin
 Mr. Pierre Micaux, UMP, Aube
 Mr. Jean Michel, socialist, Puy-de-Dôme
 Mr. Didier Migaud, socialist, Isère
 Ms. Hélène Mignon, socialist, Haute-Garonne
 Mr. Jean-Claude Mignon, UMP, Seine-et-Marne
 Ms. Marie-Anne Montchamp, UMP, Val-de-Marne
 Mr. Arnaud Montebourg, socialist, Saône-et-Loire
 Mr. Pierre Morange, UMP, Yvelines
 Ms. Nadine Morano, UMP, Meurthe-et-Moselle
 Mr. Pierre Morel-A-L'Huissier, UMP, Lozère
 Mr. Hervé Morin, UDF, Eure
 Mr. Jean-Marie Morisset, UMP, Deux-Sèvres
 Mr. Georges Mothron, independent, Val-d'Oise
 Mr. Étienne Mourrut, UMP, Gard
 Mr. Alain Moyne-Bressand, UMP, Isère
 Mr. Jacques Myard, UMP, Yvelines

N
 Mr. Henri Nayrou, socialist, Ariège
 Mr. Alain Néri, socialist, Puy-de-Dôme
 Mr. Jean-Marc Nesme, UMP, Saône-et-Loire
 Mr. Jean-Pierre Nicolas, UMP, Eure
 Mr. Yves Nicolin, UMP, Loire
 Mr. Hervé Novelli, UMP, Indre-et-Loire
 Mr. Jean-Marc Nudant, UMP, Côte-d'Or

O
 Ms. Marie-Renée Oget, socialist, Côtes-d'Armor
 Mr. Patrick Ollier, UMP, Hauts-de-Seine

P
 Mr. Dominique Paillé, UMP, Deux-Sèvres
 Mr. Michel Pajon, socialist, Seine-Saint-Denis
 Ms. Françoise de Panafieu, UMP, Paris
 Mr. Robert Pandraud, UMP, Seine-Saint-Denis
 Mr. Christian Paul, socialist, Nièvre
 Mr. Daniel Paul, communist, Seine-Maritime
 Ms. Béatrice Pavy, UMP, Sarthe
 Mr. Christophe Payet, socialist, Réunion
 Ms. Valérie Pécresse, UMP, Yvelines
 Mr. Germinal Peiro, socialist, Dordogne
 Mr. Jacques Pélissard, UMP, Jura
 Mr. Philippe Pemezec, UMP, Hauts-de-Seine
 Mr. Jean-Claude Perez, socialist, Aude
 Mr. Pierre-André Périssol, UMP, Allier
 Ms. Marie-Françoise Pérol-Dumont, socialist, Haute-Vienne
 Ms. Geneviève Perrin-Gaillard, socialist, Deux-Sèvres
 Mr. Nicolas Perruchot, UDF, Loir-et-Cher
 Mr. Bernard Perrut, UMP, Rhône
 Mr. Christian Philip, UMP, Rhône
 Mr. Étienne Pinte, UMP, Yvelines
 Mr. Michel Piron, UMP, Maine-et-Loire
 Mr. Serge Poignant, UMP, Loire-Atlantique
 Ms. Bérengère Poletti, UMP, Ardennes
 Mr. Axel Poniatowski, UMP, Val-d'Oise
 Ms. Josette Pons, UMP, Var
 Mr. Daniel Poulou, UMP, Pyrénées-Atlantiques
 Mr. Jean-Luc Préel, UDF, Vendée
 Mr. Daniel Prévost, UMP, Ille-et-Vilaine
 Mr. Christophe Priou, UMP, Loire-Atlantique
 Mr. Jean Proriol, UMP, Haute-Loire

Q
 Mr. Didier Quentin, UMP, Charente-Maritime
 Mr. Jean-Jack Queyranne, socialist, Rhône
 Mr. Paul Quilès, socialist, Tarn

R
 Mr. Michel Raison, UMP, Haute-Saône
 Ms. Marcelle Ramonet, UMP, Finistère
 Mr. Éric Raoult, UMP, Seine-Saint-Denis
 Mr. Jean-François Régère, UMP, Gironde
 Mr. Frédéric Reiss, UMP, Bas-Rhin
 Mr. Jean-Luc Reitzer, UMP, Haut-Rhin
 Mr. Jacques Remiller, UMP, Isère
 Mr. Simon Renucci, associated with socialist, Corse-du-Sud
 Mr. Marc Reymann, UMP, Bas-Rhin
 Mr. Dominique Richard, UMP, Maine-et-Loire
 Ms. Juliana Rimane, UMP, Guyane
 Mr. Jérôme Rivière, UMP, Alpes-Maritimes
 Mr. Jean Roatta, UMP, Bouches-du-Rhône
 Ms. Chantal Robin-Rodrigo, associated with socialist, Hautes-Pyrénées
 Mr. Camille de Rocca Serra, UMP, Corse-du-Sud
 Mr. François Rochebloine, UDF, Loire
 Mr. Alain Rodet, socialist, Haute-Vienne
 Ms. Marie-Josée Roig, UMP, Vaucluse
 Mr. Vincent Rolland, UMP, Savoie
 Mr. Jean-Marie Rolland, UMP, Yonne
 Mr. Bernard Roman, socialist, Nord
 Mr. Serge Roques, UMP, Aveyron
 Mr. Philippe Rouault, UMP, Ille-et-Vilaine
 Mr. Jean-Marc Roubaud, UMP, Gard
 Mr. Michel Roumegoux, UMP, Lot
 Mr. René Rouquet, socialist, Val-de-Marne
 Mr. Max Roustan, UMP, Gard
 Mr. Xavier de Roux, UMP, Charente-Maritime
 Mr. Patrick Roy, socialist, Nord
 Ms. Ségolène Royal, socialist, Deux-Sèvres

S
 Mr. Martial Saddier, UMP, Haute-Savoie
 Mr. Michel Sainte-Marie, socialist, Gironde
 Mr. Francis Saint-Léger, UMP, Lozère
 Mr. Frédéric de Saint-Sernin, UMP, Dordogne
 Mr. Rudy Salles, UDF, Alpes-Maritimes
 Mr. André Samitier, associated with UMP, Yvelines
 Mr. Pierre-Jean Samot, independent, Martinique
 Mr. Jean-Claude Sandrier, communist, Cher
 Mr. André Santini, UDF, Hauts-de-Seine
 Mr. Joël Sarlot, independent, Vendée
 Ms. Odile Saugues, socialist, Puy-de-Dôme
 Mr. François Sauvadet, UDF, Côte-d'Or
 Mr. François Scellier, UMP, Val-d'Oise
 Mr. André Schneider, UMP, Bas-Rhin
 Mr. Bernard Schreiner, UMP, Bas-Rhin
 Mr. Roger-Gérard Schwartzenberg, associated with socialist, Val-de-Marne
 Mr. Jean-Marie Sermier, UMP, Jura
 Mr. Henri Sicre, socialist, Pyrénées-Orientales
 Mr. Georges Siffredi, UMP, Hauts-de-Seine
 Mr. Yves Simon, associated with UMP, Allier
 Mr. Jean-Pierre Soisson, UMP, Yonne
 Mr. Michel Sordi, UMP, Haut-Rhin
 Mr. Frédéric Soulier, UMP, Corrèze
 Mr. Daniel Spagnou, UMP, Alpes-de-Haute-Provence
 Mr. Dominique Strauss-Kahn, socialist, Val-d'Oise
 Mr. Alain Suguenot, UMP, Côte-d'Or

T
 Ms. Michèle Tabarot, UMP, Alpes-Maritimes
 Ms. Hélène Tanguy, UMP, Finistère
 Ms. Christiane Taubira, associated with socialist, Guyane
 Mr. Jean-Charles Taugourdeau, UMP, Maine-et-Loire
 Mr. Guy Teissier, UMP, Bouches-du-Rhône
 Mr. Pascal Terrasse, socialist, Ardèche
 Mr. Michel Terrot, UMP, Rhône
 Ms. Irène Tharin, UMP, Doubs
 Mr. André Thien Ah Koon, associated with UMP, Réunion
 Mr. Jean-Claude Thomas, UMP, Marne
 Mr. Rodolphe Thomas, UDF, Calvados
 Mr. Dominique Tian, UMP, Bouches-du-Rhône
 Mr. Jean Tiberi, UMP, Paris
 Mr. Philippe Tourtelier, socialist, Ille-et-Vilaine
 Mr. Alfred Trassy-Paillogues, UMP, Seine-Maritime
 Mr. Georges Tron, UMP, Essonne

U
 Mr. Jean Ueberschlag, UMP, Haut-Rhin

V
 Mr. Léon Vachet, UMP, Bouches-du-Rhône  
 Mr. Daniel Vaillant, socialist, Paris
 Mr. André Vallini, socialist, Isère
 Mr. Manuel Valls, socialist, Essonne
 Mr. Christian Vanneste, UMP, Nord
 Mr. François Vannson, associated with UMP, Vosges
 Ms. Catherine Vautrin, UMP, Marne
 Mr. Michel Vaxès, communist, Bouches-du-Rhône
 Mr. Alain Venot, UMP, Eure-et-Loir
 Mr. Francis Vercamer, UDF, Nord
 Mr. Michel Vergnier, socialist, Creuse
 Ms. Béatrice Vernaudon, UMP, French Polynesia
 Mr. Jean-Sébastien Vialatte, UMP, Var
 Mr. René-Paul Victoria, UMP, Réunion
 Mr. Alain Vidalies, socialist, Landes
 Mr. Gérard Vignoble, UDF, Nord
 Mr. François-Xavier Villain, independent, Nord
 Mr. Philippe de Villiers, independent, Vendée
 Mr. Jean-Claude Viollet, socialist, Charente
 Mr. Philippe Vitel, UMP, Var
 Mr. Gérard Voisin, UMP, Saône-et-Loire
 Mr. Michel Voisin, UMP, Ain
 Mr. Philippe Vuilque, socialist, Ardennes

W
 Mr. Jean-Luc Warsmann, UMP, Ardennes
 Mr. Gérard Weber, UMP, Ardèche
 Mr. Éric Woerth, UMP, Oise

Z
 Ms. Marie-Jo Zimmermann, UMP, Moselle
 Mr. Émile Zuccarelli, independent, Haute-Corse
 Mr. Michel Zumkeller, UMP, Territoire de Belfort

12th
12th